The Green Party of Quebec fielded forty-six candidates in the 1989 Quebec provincial election, none of whom were elected. Information about these candidates may be found on this page.

List of candidates (incomplete)

References

1989